The 1987 U.S. Pro Tennis Championships was a men's tennis tournament played on outdoor green clay courts at the Longwood Cricket Club in Chestnut Hill, Massachusetts in the United States. The event was part of the Super Series of the 1987 Nabisco Grand Prix circuit. It was the 60th edition of the tournament and was held from July 6 through July 12, 1987. First-seeded Mats Wilander won the singles title, his second at the event after 1985.

Finals

Singles
 Mats Wilander defeated  Kent Carlsson 7–6, 6–1
 It was Wilander's 4th singles title of the year and the 25th of his career.

Doubles
 Hans Gildemeister /  Andrés Gómez defeated  Joakim Nyström /  Mats Wilander 7–6, 3–6, 6–1

References

External links
 ITF tournament details
 Longwood Cricket Club – list of U.S. Pro Champions

U.S. Pro Tennis Championships
U.S. Pro Championships
U.S. Pro Championships
U.S. Pro Championships
U.S. Pro Championships
Chestnut Hill, Massachusetts
Clay court tennis tournaments
History of Middlesex County, Massachusetts
Sports in Middlesex County, Massachusetts
Tennis tournaments in Massachusetts
Tourist attractions in Middlesex County, Massachusetts